This is a list of states in the Holy Roman Empire beginning with the letter K:

References

K